Gadheim is a village in Lower Franconia, in northern Bavaria belonging to the municipality of Veitshöchheim. It is located about 10 kilometers (6.2 miles) north of Würzburg. As of 31 January 2020, Gadheim is the site of the geodetic center of the European Union.

References

Former municipalities in Bavaria
Würzburg (district)